Abbad (also Romanized as Ābbād; also known as Owbād) is a village in Khorram Makan Rural District, Kamfiruz District, Marvdasht County, Fars Province, Iran. At the 2006 census, its population was 1,161, in 226 families.

References 

Populated places in Marvdasht County